Moirangthem Jayananda Singh (born 1 March 1999) is an Indian professional footballer who plays as a left back for the Techtro Swades United FC.

Career
Ahead of the fourth edition of the Indian Super League, Delhi Dynamos have bolstered their defence with the signing of the young and versatile defender, Jayananda Singh. The 18-year old who can play as a full-back or a centre-back has had stints with the AIFF Academy and DSK Shivajians. Coming through the ranks with the U-14 and U-16 sides whilst also leading them, the defender was a part of the side that won the U-16 SAFF Championships.

On 24 November 2020, Jayananda Singh was officially announced as a signing for Techtro Swades United FC. On his debut, he scored a goal for the club's first ever official game in Himachal Football League.

References

Living people
1999 births
People from Imphal
Footballers from Manipur
Indian footballers
Association football defenders
Fateh Hyderabad A.F.C. players
Odisha FC players